Bambang Nurdiansyah (born 28 December 1960 in Banjarmasin, East Kalimantan, Indonesia) is an Indonesian football coach and former footballer.

Playing career 
Before becoming a coach, he was a footballer, mostly with Pelita Jaya and Indonesia national football team for 11 years (1980–1991). He also played for Yanita Utama and Krama Yudha Tiga Berlian on the Galatama era on 1980s.

Managerial career 
In the 2008 season Nurdiansyah coached Indonesia Super League club, Arema Indonesia, but withdrew having just undergone four matches due to feeling pressured by Arema's support groups, Aremania. He later went to coach PSIS Semarang in the 2008/09 season.  He coached PSIS before in 2005, winning trophies for the club, but resigned due to family reason.

Previously he had trained Pelita Krakatau Steel in 2006. In addition, Bambang also trained Persita Tangerang.

In 2005, after the end of the league season, Bambang appointed by the PSSI to train the Indonesia national football team to contest against South Africa national football team in the match of the anniversary of the Golongan Karya or Golkar, a political party in the country.

He also coached the Indonesia women's national football team at SEA Games.

Currently, he manages soccer club in West Papua, Persiram Raja Ampat, that played at the 2011-12 Indonesia Super League.

He was awarded as one of 22 Indonesia football legends on the final of Piala Indonesia on 2007 

During his time coaching Cilegon United F.C., he promote them to Liga Indonesia Premier Division in 2014 after winning Liga Indonesia First Division and Liga Indonesia Second Division in two years.

Honours

Club 
Yanita Utama
Winner
 Galatama (2): 1983–84, 1984

Krama Yudha Tiga Berlian
Winner
 Galatama: 1985

Pelita Jaya
Winner
 Galatama (2): 1989–90, 1990

Managerial 
Cilegon United
Winner
 Liga Indonesia First Division: 2014
 Liga Indonesia Second Division: 2013

Individual 
 Galatama Top Goalscorer (3): 1983–84, 1984, 1985

References

External links 
 Selected as Indonesia's Legendary Player

1960 births
Indonesian football managers
Indonesian footballers
Indonesia international footballers
Living people
People from Banjarmasin
Southeast Asian Games gold medalists for Indonesia
Southeast Asian Games medalists in football
Association football forwards
Competitors at the 1991 Southeast Asian Games